Marcel Novick Rettich (born 11 October 1983 in Montevideo) is a Uruguayan footballer. His nickname is Vikingo (Spanish for "the Viking").

He plays as defensive midfielder in Club Atlético Peñarol.

Family
Novick is son of businessman and politician Edgardo Novick, and brother of footballer Hernán Novick.

References

External links 
 
 

1983 births
Living people
Footballers from Montevideo
Uruguayan footballers
Association football midfielders
Uruguayan Primera División players
Centro Atlético Fénix players
Rocha F.C. players
El Tanque Sisley players
Villa Española players
Rampla Juniors players
Peñarol players